Lynne is a surname of English, Scottish or Irish origin.  See Lynn (surname) for derivation.

People with the surname (given or married, stage names not included) include:

 Bjørn Lynne (born 1966), Norwegian musician
 Gloria Lynne (1929–2013), American jazz singer
 Jaime Lynne (born 1979), American wrestler
 Jeff Lynne (born 1947), English musician
 Judy Lynne (born 1943), American actress
 Lisa Lynne, Celtic musician
 Liz Lynne (born 1948), English politician
 Michael Lynne (born 1941), American film executive
 Seybourn Harris Lynne (1907–2000), American judge

Variations
Variations on this name include: Lyness, Lynn, Lyns